Ninh Thuận (Cham: ꨘꨪꨘ ꨔꨥꨬꨋ, Nin Ţvêŋ) is a province in the South Central Coast region of Vietnam (sometimes seen as part of the Southeast region).

History
The Cham principality of Panduranga had its center in Ninh Thuận province, but also included much of what is now Bình Thuận province. Panduranga became the political centre of Champa after the fall of Vijaya in 1471. It remained independent until 1832, when emperor Minh Mạng annexed it. Ninh Thuận was merged into Bình Thuận province in 1976, together with Bình Tuy province, Ninh Thuận became a separate province again in 1991.

Geography
Only a small part of the province around Phan Rang has elevations of under . The province's major river is the Dinh River, which flows through the main lowland of the province as well as Phan Rang. It has several tributaries in the province and is connected to Don Duong Lake in Lâm Đồng province.

As of 2007, 55.7 per cent of Ninh Thuận's area was covered by forests, making it the most forested province of the South Central Coast. Forests cover most of Ninh Hải District at the coast in the north east, and most of the north and south west of the province. There are reserves of molybdenum in the north of the province.

Demography
Ninh Thuận had a population of 565,700 in 2009. Its urban population was 185,700 or 32.3% in 2007, a rapid increase from the 123,700 seven years ago. The urban population grew by an average 6% from 2000 to 2007, while the rural population actually had slightly negative growth. Overall population growth averaged 1.5%, which is the second highest in the South Central Coast after Da Nang.

Apart from the Kinh, significant parts of the province's population belong to the Cham and Raglai ethnic groups. Many of the Cham live near the capital Phan Rang. The Raglai live in more remote parts of the province, such as the Ninh Hải District in the north-east and the mountainous regions in the west.

As of April 1, 2009, the province has 10 observed religions, with a total of 184 577 followers. In particular, there are 65,790 Catholics, followed by Buddhism with 43,192 people, Hindus 40,695 (the highest proportion in the country), Muslims 25,513, Protestants 7,570, and other minor religions. There are 1,784 people following Cao Dai, 26 people following Bahá'í , 5 people in  Hoa Hao Buddhism and the Pure Land Buddhist Association in Vietnam had one follower.

Administrative divisions

Ninh Thuận is subdivided into 7 district-level sub-divisions:

6 districts:

 Bác Ái
 Ninh Hải
 Ninh Phước
 Ninh Sơn
 Thuận Bắc
 Thuận Nam

1 provincial city:
 Phan Rang–Tháp Chàm (capital)

They are further subdivided into 3 commune-level towns (or townlets), 47 communes, and 15 wards.

Cham villages
Cham names for Cham villages in Ninh Thuận province are as follows (Sakaya 2014:755-756).

Economy
Ninh Thuận is southern Vietnam's poorest and least industrialized province. Nominal per capita GDP was 6.66 million VND in 2007, half of the national average and 56% of the South Central Coast's average of 10.8 million VND. Ninh Thuận has also been the only province in the South Central Coast with an average annual GDP growth rate of less than 10% from 2000 to 2007 - at 9.4% compared to the region's average of 11.2%. While its industrial growth has been slightly above the region's average at 16.4%, it started from a very low base and therefore contributed little to overall growth. Growth in services has been at 9.8%, significantly below the region's average, while agriculture, forestry and fishing have grown at an average rate of 6.7%, somewhat higher than the average.

Agriculture, forestry, fishing
Ninh Thuận's agriculture is mostly based on rice. 33,400 ha out of a total of 70,000 ha were used for the cultivation of rice, followed by maize with 14,200 ha. 173,200 t of rice and 36,300 t of maize were harvested in 2007, accounting for 0.5% and 0.9% of national output. The most important cash crop is tobacco. It is grown on 1,300 ha (as of 2007) in the central part of the province west and north-east of Phan Rang with an output of 3,300 t, or 10.3% of Vietnam's total output. The province also harvested 200 t in 2007, 1.2% of the national total. Other less significant crops include cashew nuts, sugar-cane, peanuts, and coconuts.

Despite the large forests of the province, there is little commercial use of forest resources. Gross output of the forestry sector was 23.7 billion VND, accounting for only 1.8% of the South Central Coast, and therefore even less than Da Nang. Much of the province's forests are protected as part of Núi Chúa National Park and Phước Bình National Park.  These National Parks as well as the nearby Vịnh Vĩnh Hy attracted the building of Amanoi, a five star franchise hotel belonging to Aman Resorts.

Ninh Thuận's fishing gross output was 1138.8 billion VND in 2007, 1.3% of Vietnam's output and therefore more significant in a national context than agriculture. It has grown at an average of 11.7%, far exceeding agricultural growth and making it one of the fastest growing sectors of the economy. As of 2007, there were 589 offshore fishing vessels registered in the province.

Industry
Ninh Thuận has a very small industrial sector, with a gross output accounting for only 2% of the South Central Coast's total. Industry contributes 1.3 million VND to the GDP per capita, compared to an average of 4.4 million VND for the region.

The province's industrial products are mostly basic processed food and seafood products (frozen aquatic products, fish sauce, shelled cashew nuts) and processed raw materials (stones, bricks, salt). However, the industrial sector's growth of 16.4% has enabled it to absorb much of Ninh Thuận's labor force growth by increasing industrial employment from 14,900 in 2000 to 43,700 in 2007 - although this employment growth has been overshadowed by the service sector, which created 57,300 additional jobs in the same period despite its slower growth.

Infrastructure

Transport
Ninh Thuận is located along Vietnam's main north-south corridors. National Route 1 as well as the North–South Railway run through the province. Ninh Thuận's main railway station is at Tháp Chàm. There are also two smaller railway station: Bà Râu in Thuận Bắc District in the north and Cà Ná near the southern border. Phan Rang is connected to Da Lat by National Road 27 via Ngoan Muc Pass. There used to be a railway serving the same route, but it has not been in use since the start of the Vietnam War.

Ninh Thuận has three ports: 
 at Vịnh Vĩnh Hy in northeastern Ninh Hải District
 Ninh Chu Port in southern Ninh Hải District near Phan Rang
 Cà Ná Port in the south of the province

The nearest commercial airport is Cam Ranh International Airport.

Energy

Ninh Thuận has become a renewable energy production base starting in the late 2020s, taking advantage of the local climate with the lowest annual rainfall, highest total solar heat radiation and fastest average wind speed in Vietnam. However, it is located far from major load centers of Vietnam.

As of 2021, around 100 ha of photovoltaic panels were already deployed in the province, with several projects still under construction. Solar power capacity totaled 2,256 MW in 2021. 

Construction of a 200 MW wind power plant has also started and is planned to be completed by 2012. The total planned wind power capacity is 1,429MW.

Da Nhim hydropower plant is located in Ninh Sơn District in the northwest of Ninh Thuận. Ninh Thuận was chosen as the site for some of Vietnam's future electricity projects that are part of Vietnam Electricity's diversification away from hydropower. The country's first nuclear power plant is under construction in the south of the province. A second nuclear power project is being prepared with Japanese partners and will also be in Ninh Thuận.

References

External links
Official site of Ninh Thuan Government
Management and Capacity Development Unit of Water Resources and Services Ninh Thuan

 
Provinces of Vietnam